Dimethanospiro[2.2]octaplane is a hypothetical saturated hydrocarbon that is expected to have a carbon atom in with a stable, unusual square-planar coordination rather than the usual tetrahedral geometry of a carbon atom with four bonds.

Molecular architecture 
An octaplane contains a central carbon atom is surrounded by four carbon atoms, which are held in place by perpendicular links to two cyclooctane rings above and below. The parent structure octaplane itself is expected to have a very low ionization potential and a square–planar geometry as the monocation, however calculations on the neutral compound found that the central carbon would distort to a square–pyramidal geometry.

In dimethanospiro[2.2]octaplane, two pairs of the carbons attached to the central one are bonded to each other to make a spiropentane, and there are two methylene linkages between the two cyclooctane rings.

References

Hypothetical chemical compounds
Polycyclic nonaromatic hydrocarbons
Cyclopropanes
Spiro compounds
Cyclohexanes